Current stations operated by DB Station&Service in Bavaria:

Sources

See also
German railway station categories
Railway station types of Germany
List of scheduled railway routes in Germany

External links 
 Online timetable of DB services

 
Bav
Rail